HC Gomel is a handball club from Gomel, Belarus. They  compete in the Belarusian Men's Handball Championship and in the SEHA League.

European record

Squad
Squad for the 2022–23 season

Goalkeepers
 12  Vladyslav Sukalo
 41  Uladzimir Korsak
Left Wingers
 22  Maksim Krasouski
 76  Ilya Tamashuk
Right Wingers
 24  Maksim Karlouski
 25  Vitaly Zinchanka
Line players
 30  Mikhail Pilyuk
 87  Victor Skrypak

Left Backs
3  Dzmitry Biahun
5  Andrei Yashchanka 
 77  Ihar Kazhadub 
Central Backs
 27  Siarhei Mikhalchuk
 88  Siarhei Zhurau
Right Backs
 19  Ivan Saratouski
 78  Stanislav Shafalovich

External links 
 EHF Profile

Belarusian handball clubs
Sport in Gomel
1960 establishments in Belarus
Handball clubs established in 1960